Comaldessus stygius is a species of beetles in the family Dytiscidae, the only species in the genus Comaldessus.

References

Dytiscidae genera
Monotypic Adephaga genera